On March 9, 2004, an attack on a restaurant in the Kartal district of Istanbul, Turkey killed Hüseyin Kurugöl, a waiter in the restaurant, and injured five others. The two Islamic militants who carried out the attack, Engin Vural and Nihat Doğruel, were holding automatic weapons and had ten homemade pipe bombs strapped to their flak jackets when they entered the restaurant frequented by freemasons. Shooting the guard in his feet, they entered the dining hall and began firing at the forty people in the room. Then they detonated bombs at the entrance, killing Kurugöl. One of the militants died in the attack, the other was seriously injured. 

This attack occurred 911 days after the September 11 attacks. On March 11, the newspaper Al-Quds Al-Arabi received a statement which claimed that an al-Qaeda affiliated group, Jund al-Quds, ('Soldiers of Jerusalem'), had carried out the attack. The statement's primary purpose was to claim responsibility for the March 11, 2004 Madrid attacks.

In August 2004, the trial of the suspects began. While Turkish authorities said there was likely an al-Qaeda link, the surviving bomber, Engin Vural, claimed it was an independent act he planned along with the dead bomber, Nihat Doğruel. The prosecution charged that a man named Adem Çetinkaya, who was also charged, organized the attack and was also planning to bomb a private television station.

References

External links
 Raid On Mason Lodge: They Were To Be Burnt, in Hürriyet 11 March 2004
 
  A list of Engin Vural news on Turkish media
  https://web.archive.org/web/20080628212915/http://www.barobirlik.org.tr/calisma/basinda_yargi/2004/03/16.htm
  https://web.archive.org/web/20120208115823/http://www.mehmetfarac.com/belge.asp?select=254

Attack on Istanbul restaurant
2000s in Istanbul
Attacks on restaurants in Asia
Attacks on restaurants in Europe
Attack on Istanbul restaurant
Attack on Istanbul restaurant
March 2004 crimes
March 2004 events in Turkey
Murder in Istanbul
Terrorist incidents in Istanbul
Istanbul restaurant
Explosions in Istanbul